Volker is an old German name, derived from ,  (people, tribe), and  (army, warrior).

Notable people with the name include:

Given name

 Volker Beck (politician) (born 1960), German politician (Greens)
 Volker Beck (athlete),  East German athlete
 Volker Bouffier (born 1951), German politician (CDU)
 Volker Braun, German author
 Volker Bruch, German actor
 Volker Eckert (1959-2007), German serial killer
 Volker Engel (born 1965), German-born visual effects artist with Hollywood credits
 Volker Finke, German football manager and former player
 Volker Grassmuck, German sociologist and media researcher
 Volker Herold, German actor and director
 Volker Kriegel, German jazz guitarist and composer
 Volker Lechtenbrink, German television actor and singer
 Volker Pispers, German political comedian
 Volker Rühe, (born 1942), German politician and former Defence Minister (CDU) 
 Volker Schlöndorff, German filmmaker
 Volker Schmidt (born 1978), German footballer
 Volker Strassen, German  mathematician
 Volker Weidler, German (former) racing driver
 Volker Zerbe,  German team handball (former) player, later club manager 
 Volker Zotz, Austrian philosopher and author

Surname
 Alexandra Völker (born 1989), Swedish politician
 Floyd Volker (1921–1995), American basketball player
 Franz Völker (1899–1965), German opera singer
 Karl Völker (1889–1962), German architect and painter
 Kurt Volker (born 1964), American diplomat
 Paul Volcker (born 1927), American economist and policy-maker
 Sabine Völker (born 1973), German speed skater
 Sandra Völker (born 1974), German swimmer
 William Volker (1859–1947), German-born American entrepreneur

See also
 Voelcker
 Volkers, a surname

Surnames from given names